Give It is the eighteenth album from Arthur Loves Plastic and was released in 2009.

Release notes
"Another mischievous instalment from Arthur Loves Plastic, with electro and contemporized disco flourishes. From the demanding groove of "Give It" to the house-engorged throb of "Searching for Love" this is an artist coming of age yet not getting old."

Track listing

The track "Hurting Divinely" is also known as "Hurt Me So Badly" and "Sad".

Personnel
Produced by Bev Stanton at Sligo House, Silver Spring, MD.

Additional musicians
Harry Applebaum - Organ (1)
Phil Mathieu - Guitar (2, 9)
Chris Phinney - Loops (2)
Anti Gravity Workshop - Loops (3, 11) *
Buzzsaw & The Shavings - Loops (3) *
John Nazdin - Bass (4, 5)
Robbie Magruder - Drum Loops (4, 5)
Cystem - Guitar (7, 8, 11) *
Phil Mathieu - Guitar (Excerpt from "Chamber Music with Guitar") (9)
Carolyn Hyun Ha Oh - Flute (Excerpt from "Chamber Music with Guitar") (9)
Dan Henderson - Cello (Excerpt from "Chamber Music with Guitar") (9)

* Remixed for The Tapegerm Collective

Credits
Gabriella Fabbri (duchessa/stock.xchng) - Cover image

References

Arthur Loves Plastic albums
2009 albums